Anosovo is a rural locality (a selo) in Novovoskresenovsky Selsoviet of Shimanovsky District, Amur Oblast, Russia. The population was 96 as of 2018. There are two streets.

Geography 
Anosovo is located on the Ulmin River, 144 km northwest of Shimanovsk (the district's administrative centre) by road. Novovoskresenovka is the nearest rural locality.

References 

Rural localities in Shimanovsky District